Clay County Hospital is a historic hospital located at Brazil, Clay County, Indiana.  It was built in 1927–1928, and is a -story, tan brick Colonial Revival style building.  It is limestone trim and a slate hipped roof.  Also on the property are the contributing former nurses residence (1947), original entrance, and two brick corner posts.

It was added to the National Register of Historic Places in 1999.

References

Hospital buildings on the National Register of Historic Places in Indiana
Colonial Revival architecture in Indiana
Hospital buildings completed in 1928
Buildings and structures in Clay County, Indiana
National Register of Historic Places in Clay County, Indiana
1928 establishments in Indiana